Snider is an Anglicized occupational surname derived from Dutch Snijder "tailor" (alternatively spelled "Snyder" in the past, see "ij"/"y"), related to modern Dutch Snijders and Sneijder. It may also be an Anglicized spelling of the German Schneider or Swiss German Schnyder, which both carry the same meaning. The more common Anglicized spelling of the Dutch Snijder is Snyder.

Notable people with the surname include:

Collin Snider (born 1995), American baseball player
Duke Snider (1926–2011), American baseball player
Dee Snider (born 1955), American musician and radio personality
Malcolm Snider (born 1947), American football player
Matt Snider (born 1976), American football player
Myatt Snider (born 1994), American racecar driver
Samuel Snider (1845–1928), American politician
Todd Snider (born 1966), musician
Travis Snider (born 1988), American baseball player
Van Snider (born 1963), American baseball player
Warner B. Snider (1880–1965), American politician, rancher, and sheriff
Antonio Snider-Pellegrini (1802–1885), French geographer and scientist

See also
Snyder (surname)

References

Occupational surnames
German-language surnames